Madarious Jaquil Gibbs (born May 7, 1993) is an American basketball player. He completed his college career at Texas Southern University (TSU).

Gibbs, a point guard from Newnan, Georgia, played four seasons for TSU, leading the team to back-to-back Southwestern Athletic Conference (SWAC) titles in 2014 and 2015. As a senior in the 2014–15 season, Gibbs was named SWAC Player of the Year and an honorable mention All-American by the Associated Press. Gibbs led the Tigers to the 2015 SWAC Tournament title, earning MVP honors.

Gibbs went undrafted in the 2015 NBA draft. As a means to increase his chances of securing a free agent deal, Gibbs joined his former TSU teammates on a playing tour of China in the Summer of 2015.

College career (2011–15) 
Gibbs attended Texas Southern University and played under coach, Tony Harvey during his freshman year for Texas Southern Tigers basketball. That year, he started 9 out of the 33 games as his team finished with a 15–18 record and missed the NCAA tournament. The

Professional career

Monopoli Italy 
In Season 2016–17 he play in Serie C Italy for Monopoli Italy. He averaged 24.7 points, 6 rebounds, 4 assists with 58.0% FG, 37.0% 3FG and 72.0% FT in 27 games.

Satya Wacana Salatiga (2017–present)
Gibbs was selected in the 2nd round of 2017 Indonesian Basketball League Draft by Satya Wacana Salatiga. Gibbs played extremely well in his first year with Satya Wacana as he averaged league-leading 27.56 points along with 5.7 rebounds, 5.4 assists and 1.7 steals. His team however only won 5 games and missed the playoff. Gibbs was retained by Satya Wacana for the 2018–19 season. On December 9, 2018, Gibbs scored a career-high 53 points as he and his team upset a powerhouse team in Pelita Jaya.

Career statistics

Regular season

References

External links
Texas Southern Tigers bio
College stats @ sports-reference.com
 https://instagram.com/mdotgibbs3

1993 births
Living people
African-American basketball players
American expatriate basketball people in Indonesia
American expatriate basketball people in Italy
American men's basketball players
Basketball players from Georgia (U.S. state)
People from Newnan, Georgia
Point guards
Sportspeople from the Atlanta metropolitan area
Texas Southern Tigers men's basketball players
21st-century African-American sportspeople